Bret Lott (born October 8, 1958) is the New York Times author and professor of English at the College of Charleston. He is Crazyhorse magazine's nonfiction editor and leads a study abroad program every summer to Spoleto, Italy.

Lott was appointed to the National Council of the Arts by President George W. Bush and served a six-year term. He was a Fulbright Senior American Scholar in 2006 and writer-in-residence at Bar-Ilan University in Tel Aviv, Israel. He was invited by Laura Bush to speak at the White House as part of the White House Symposium on “Classic American Stories” in 2004.

Personal life 
Born in Los Angeles, California in 1958, Lott grew up in Buena Park, California and Phoenix, Arizona, before returning to California to live in Huntington Beach. He met and married his wife of 40 years, Melanie Swank Lott, at First Baptist Church of Huntington Beach/Fountain Valley. A graduate of Cal State Long Beach (1981), Lott headed to Massachusetts for graduate school at UMass Amherst. He received his MFA in 1984 and landed his first teaching position at Ohio State University. In 1986, Lott joined the English Department at the College of Charleston, where he is now a tenured professor and director of the new MFA program.

Awards and Distinctions 
 Recipient of the Ohio Arts Council Aid to Artists Fellowship in Literature for 1986–1987
 Recipient of the South Carolina Arts Commission Fellowship in Literature for 1987–1988
 Winner, PEN/NEA Syndicated Fiction Project Award, 1985, 1991, 1993
 Bread Loaf Fellow in Fiction, Bread Loaf Writers’ Conference, 1991
 Distinguished Research Award, College of Charleston, 1995
 Distinguished Alumni Award, University of Massachusetts, Amherst, 1999
 Chancellor’s Medal, University of Massachusetts, 2000
 In Praise of Teaching Award, College of Charleston, January 2002
 Recipient, The Avalon Award for Excellence in the Arts, Lipscomb University, October 10, 2005
 Recipient, The Leila Lenore Heasley Prize for a Distinguished Representative of American and International Letters, Lyon College, 21 March 2006
 Recipient, The Denise Levertov Award, Seattle Pacific University, 8 May 2007
 Recipient, Fulbright Senior Scholar appointment as writer-in-residence, Bar-Ilan University, Tel Aviv, Israel, October 2006 through January 2007
 National Council on the Arts: Member, 2006—2012
 Appointed the Ferrol A. Sams, Jr., Distinguished Chair in English, Mercer University, 2012

Books 

, an Oprah's Book Club selection made into a film Jewel (2001)

References 

1958 births
Living people
20th-century American novelists
21st-century American novelists
American magazine editors
American male novelists
College of Charleston faculty
Louisiana State University faculty
Writers from Charleston, South Carolina
Writers from Los Angeles
Novelists from Louisiana
American male short story writers
20th-century American short story writers
21st-century American short story writers
People from Buena Park, California
20th-century American male writers
21st-century American male writers
Novelists from California
Novelists from South Carolina
20th-century American non-fiction writers
21st-century American non-fiction writers
American male non-fiction writers